The 1891 American Cup was the seventh edition of the soccer tournament organized by the American Football Association. The Fall River East Ends won their first title, keeping the title in Fall River for the fourth year running. Fall River Olympic won the title in 1890 and Fall River Rovers won in 1888 and 1889. The Fall River Rovers were readmitted to the AFA after having settled their dispute with the Pawtucket Free Wanderers, before which any associations teams were barred from playing them.

Participants 

Joining this season were British Hosiery, Cumberland Rangers, Holyoke Rangers, Lowell Thistle, New Rochelle, and Nonpareils. Not returning from last season were Lonsdale, Paterson FC, Providence Athletic, and Trenton FC.

The participating teams were:

 Massachusetts: Holyoke Rangers, Lowell Thistle, Fall River East Ends, Fall River Olympic, Fall River Rovers
 New Jersey: Caledonian (Newark), Kearney Rovers, ONT (Kearney)
 New York: Longfellows (Brooklyn), New Rochelle FC, New York Thistle, Nonpareils (Brooklyn)
 Rhode Island: British Hosiery (also known as British Harriers and Thornton FC, from Thornton), Cumberland Rangers, Pawtucket Free Wanderers

Round 1 

The drawing for round one took place on Saturday September 20. Caledonian drew a bye to Round 2. Matches to be played on or before October 18.

Eastern District 

One source gave the final score as 7–0. Another gave the half-time score as 7-0 and the final as 10–1.

A protest was entered by Fall River Olympic over an unregistered player (John Stuart). The match was ordered to be played again on the Pawtucket grounds by November 15.

Western District 

Thistles failed to show up. Match was given to Kearney Rovers.

Two sources gave a final score of 13–0. Two others gave a final score of 14–0.

ONT withdrew.

Replay

Round 2 

The drawing for round two took place on Saturday October 25, matches to be played within the next six weeks.

Eastern District 

Match was protested by East Ends, but the protest was dismissed.

Western District 

AFA decided in favor of Nonpareils after failure to arrange dates with Kearny Rovers.

Round 3 

Round 3 matches were arranged at a meeting on Saturday December 20. Nonpareil to play Longfellows and Fall River East Ends to play Fall River Rovers, on or before the First Saturday in March.

Eastern District 

Fall River Rovers entered a protest. A meeting was held on Saturday March 14 to consider the protest but a quorum was not present.

Western District

Replay

Final

References

1891
1891 in association football
1891 in American sports